Dariusz Ulanowski (born 3 March 1971 in Słupsk, Poland) is a former footballer who played in Ekstraklasa for Arka Gdynia, and spent his entire professional career with them.

References

Polish footballers
Ekstraklasa players
Arka Gdynia players
1971 births
Living people
Sportspeople from Słupsk
Association football defenders 
Association football midfielders